Australian electronic musician Flume has released three studio albums, two mixtape albums, four extended plays, nineteen singles and eleven music videos.

Albums

Studio albums

Remix albums

Mixtapes

Extended plays

Singles

Other charted songs

Remixes

Songwriting and production credits

Essential Mix
Flume appeared on the BBC Radio 1 Essential Mix show on 3 October 2015, about six months before the release of his second studio album, Skin. The mix featured his own music and tracks from electronic artists including Jon Hopkins, Amon Tobin, and Jamie xx, as well as hip hop artists Knxwledge, Vic Mensa, Vince Staples, and Kanye West.

Music videos

Notes

References 

Discographies of Australian artists